Ken Carano is a former Democratic member of the Ohio House of Representatives, representing the 59th District from 2001 to 2007.

Ken also served as Austintown Township Trustee and as the General Manager of Austintown Community Television.

External links
Page on the Ohio House of Representatives website

Year of birth missing (living people)
Living people
Democratic Party members of the Ohio House of Representatives
21st-century American politicians
People from Austintown, Ohio